

See also 
 Connecticut's at-large congressional district special election, 1810
 United States House of Representatives elections, 1810 and 1811
 List of United States representatives from Connecticut

1810
Connecticut
United States House of Representatives